"Good Life" is a 1990 single by The Braxtons, featuring Toni Braxton and her four sisters: Towanda, Trina, Traci, and Tamar. "Good Life", written by the German songwriting/production team Klarmann/Weber, was Toni Braxton's first professional recording.

Toni Braxton and her sisters signed with Arista Records as The Braxtons in 1989. In 1990, they released "Good Life", their first and only single as a fivesome. The single, backed with "Family" as a B-side, reached #79 on the Billboard Hot Black Single charts. The song wasn't a major hit but it caught the attention of the songwriting/production team of L.A. Reid and Babyface, who had just formed their own label, LaFace Records (associated with Arista). Toni Braxton was signed with LaFace as a solo artist.

The Braxtons disbanded as a foursome but would later reunite as a threesome in 1996, when Trina, Tamar, and Towanda released So Many Ways on Atlantic Records. Traci was not signed because she was pregnant at the time. The Braxtons disbanded for good when Tamar left the group for a solo record deal.

"Good Life" is featured on The Essential Toni Braxton.

References 
Braxton Family values: 20 Fun Facts About Toni Braxton - article on WeTV

1990 singles
Toni Braxton songs
Songs written by Felix Weber (songwriter)
1990 songs
Arista Records singles